The 1991–92 Benson & Hedges World Series was a One Day International (ODI) cricket tri-series where Australia played host to India  and West Indies. Australia and India reached the Finals, which Australia won 2–0.

Points table

Result summary

Final series
Australia won the best-of-three Final series against India 2–0. David Boon was named players of series.

References

External links 
 Tournament home at ESPNcricinfo

Australian Tri-Series
1991 in cricket
1992 in cricket
1991–92 Australian cricket season
1991–92
International cricket competitions from 1991–92 to 1994
1991 in Australian cricket
1992 in Australian cricket
1991 in Indian cricket
1992 in Indian cricket
1991–92